Statistics of Emperor's Cup in the 1996 season.

Overview
It was contested by 80 teams, and Verdy Kawasaki won the championship.

Results

1st Round 
Denso 3–1 Juntendo University
Blaze Kumamoto 2–1 Kwansei Gakuin University
World Blitz Koyama 0–7 Vissel Kobe
Nippon Bunri University 1–3 Mitsubishi Motors Mizushima
Kaiho Bank SC 0–4 Montedio Yamagata
Renaiss Gakuen Koga SC 1–1 (PK 5–3) Hokkaido University
Morioka Zebra 0–5 Fujitsu
Fukuoka University 2–2 (PK 5–4) Albireo Niigata
Kawasoe Club 2–5 Ventforet Kofu
FC Matsue 0–9 Kokushikan University
Matsuyama University 0–11 Brummell Sendai
Tokai University 1–0 Osaka University of Commerce
Wakayama University 0–3 Consadole Sapporo
Gonohe City Hall 2–1 Sanyo FC
Fukushima 2–1 Hitachi Shimizu SC
Teihens FC 0–4 Tsukuba University
NTT Kanto 2–0 Doshisha University
YKK AP SC 0–5 Waseda University
Mind House Yokkaichi 1–5 Tokyo Gas
Ueda Gentian 1–2 Kunimi High School
Central Chugoku 0–3 Tosu Futures
Sony Sendai 2–1 Hiroshima Teachers
Tenri University 0–1 Cosmo Oil Yokkaichi FC
Prima Ham Tsuchiura 2–3 Komazawa University
Tokushima Commercial High School 1–5 Oita Trinity
Volca Kagoshima 3–1 TDK
Yamagata FC 1–7 Otsuka Pharmaceutical
Kochi University 8–1 Miyazaki Teachers
Aoyama Gakuin University 0–4 Honda
Toa University 3–4 Kagawa Shiun Club
Maruoka High School 0–4 Seino Transportation SC
Yonago Higashi High School 0–4 Kansai University

2nd Round 
Denso 3–1 Blaze Kumamoto
Vissel Kobe 4–2 Mitsubishi Motors Mizushima
Montedio Yamagata 6–0 Renaiss Gakuen Koga SC
Fujitsu 3–0 Fukuoka University
Ventforet Kofu 1–2 Kokushikan University
Brummell Sendai 4–1 Tokai University
Consadole Sapporo 4–0 Gonohe City Hall
Fukushima 3–0 Tsukuba University
NTT Kanto 1–0 Waseda University
Tokyo Gas 8–0 Kunimi High School
Tosu Futures 5–2 Sony Sendai
Cosmo Oil Yokkaichi FC 3–0 Komazawa University
Oita Trinity 6–1 Volca Kagoshima
Otsuka Pharmaceutical 2–1 Kochi University
Honda 3–2 Kagawa Shiun Club
Seino Transportation SC 1–2 Kansai University

3rd Round 
Yokohama Flügels 4–0 Denso
Kyoto Purple Sanga 4–3 Vissel Kobe
Gamba Osaka 4–1 Montedio Yamagata
JEF United Ichihara 0–0 (PK 4–5) Fujitsu
Kashiwa Reysol 1–0 Kokushikan University
Sanfrecce Hiroshima 2–0 Brummell Sendai
Shimizu S-Pulse 1–0 Consadole Sapporo
Júbilo Iwata 1–2 Fukushima
Urawa Red Diamonds 3–0 NTT Kanto
Cerezo Osaka 3–1 Tokyo Gas
Bellmare Hiratsuka 1–0 Tosu Futures
Nagoya Grampus Eight 0–1 Cosmo Oil Yokkaichi FC
Verdy Kawasaki 4–0 Oita Trinity
Yokohama Marinos 1–2 Otsuka Pharmaceutical
Avispa Fukuoka 3–1 Honda
Kashima Antlers 2–0 Kansai University

4th Round 
Yokohama Flügels 0–1 Kyoto Purple Sanga
Gamba Osaka 3–1 Fujitsu
Kashiwa Reysol 1–2 Sanfrecce Hiroshima
Shimizu S-Pulse 2–1 Fukushima
Urawa Red Diamonds 4–0 Cerezo Osaka
Bellmare Hiratsuka 3–1 Cosmo Oil Yokkaichi FC
Verdy Kawasaki 4–0 Otsuka Pharmaceutical
Avispa Fukuoka 0–2 Kashima Antlers

Quarterfinals 
Kyoto Purple Sanga 2–3 Gamba Osaka
Sanfrecce Hiroshima 3–0 Shimizu S-Pulse
Urawa Red Diamonds 3–0 Bellmare Hiratsuka
Verdy Kawasaki 2–1 Kashima Antlers

Semifinals 
Gamba Osaka 0–2 Sanfrecce Hiroshima
Urawa Red Diamonds 0–3 Verdy Kawasaki

Final 

Sanfrecce Hiroshima 0–3 Verdy Kawasaki
Verdy Kawasaki won the championship.

References
 NHK

Emperor's Cup
Emperor's Cup
1997 in Japanese football